Lisa Vittozzi (born 4 February 1995) is an Italian biathlete. She competes in the Biathlon World Cup, Vittozzi has won a bronze medal at the Biathlon World Championships 2015 in Kontiolahti (4 × 6 km relay).

At the Pyeongchang 2018 Winter Olympics she won the bronze medal in the Mixed relay.

Biathlon results
All results are sourced from the International Biathlon Union.

Olympic Games
1 medal (1 bronze)

World Championships
8 medals (1 gold, 3 silver, 4 bronze)

*During Olympic seasons competitions are only held for those events not included in the Olympic program.
**The single mixed relay was added as an event in 2019.

World Cup

Individual podiums

*Results are from IBU races which include the Biathlon World Cup, Biathlon World Championships and the Winter Olympic Games.

Updated on 9 March 2023

Relay podiums

References

External links

Athlete profile at Olympic.org

1995 births
Living people
Italian female biathletes
Olympic biathletes of Italy
Biathletes at the 2018 Winter Olympics
Biathletes at the 2022 Winter Olympics
Biathlon World Championships medalists
Biathletes at the 2012 Winter Youth Olympics
Sportspeople from the Province of Belluno
Medalists at the 2018 Winter Olympics
Olympic medalists in biathlon
Olympic bronze medalists for Italy
Biathletes of Gruppo Sportivo Forestale
Biathletes of Centro Sportivo Carabinieri